In probability theory, the Landau distribution is a probability distribution named after Lev Landau.
Because of the distribution's "fat" tail, the moments of the distribution, like mean or variance, are undefined. The distribution is a particular case of stable distribution.

Definition
The probability density function, as written originally by Landau, is defined by the complex integral:

where a is an arbitrary positive real number, meaning that the integration path can be any parallel to the imaginary axis, intersecting the real positive semi-axis, and  refers to the natural logarithm.
In other words it is the Laplace transform of the function .

The following real integral is equivalent to the above:

Properties

 Translation: If  then .
 Scaling: If  then .
 Sum: If  and  then .

These properties can all be derived from the characteristic function.
Together they imply that the Landau distribution is closed under affine transformations.

Approximations 

where  is Euler's constant.

Related distributions
 The Landau distribution is a stable distribution with stability parameter  and skewness parameter  both equal to 1.

References 

Continuous distributions
Probability distributions with non-finite variance
Power laws
Stable distributions
Lev Landau